Sadasiv Bagaitkar (1923-1983) was an Indian politician. He was a Member of Parliament, representing Maharashtra in the Rajya Sabha the upper house of India's Parliament as a member of the Janata Party. He was Chairman and Secretary of Praja Socialist Party in Maharashtra from 1957 to 1960.

References

Rajya Sabha members from Maharashtra
Janata Party politicians
Praja Socialist Party politicians
1923 births
1983 deaths